Sabena Flight 877 was a scheduled passenger flight from Brussels Airport, Brussels, Belgium to Jomo Kenyatta International Airport in Nairobi, Kenya via Bujumbura International Airport in Bujumbura, Burundi. On 4 December 2000, Hutu rebels fired machine guns at the Airbus A330-223 operating the flight as it landed in Bujumbura, damaging the aircraft and injuring two of the 170 people on board. There were no fatalities.

Incident 
Flight 877 was cleared to land at Bujumbura at 17:23 local time. Out of the 158 passengers on board, 76 had  Bujumbura as their final destination, while the remaining 76 would head to Nairobi.

The aircraft passed over Goma in the Democratic Republic of the Congo on approach to runway 17 at Bujumbura Airport, rather than landing on runway 35, which involves passing over Lake Tanganyika. This may have been done due to faulty runway lights or the fact that runway 17 is preferred for landing in Bujumbura due to surrounding terrain and ILS installation.

At 17:56, just  from the runway, machine guns were fired at the aircraft, lasting 20 seconds, after which the aircraft landed. Two people were injured.

The aircraft's nose wheel hydraulics system had been damaged by the gunfire, resulting in difficulty in taxiing after landing.

Investigation 
Burundi's attorney general set up a commission to investigate the incident. The airport and its surrounding area were investigated. Airport employees, soldiers, as well as passengers and crew were interviewed.

Burundian authorities blamed the shooting on Hutu rebels who were dissatisfied with a peace agreement signed the previous month. The rebels believed that the aircraft was carrying weapons. Three people were prosecuted for their role in the incident, and another four were arrested.

On 21 December 2000, in accordance with aviation law, Belgian judicial police traveled to Bordeaux (where the aircraft was being repaired) to assess the damage to the aircraft.

Aftermath 
Sabena immediately suspended all flights to and from Burundi, and were later terminated with the airline's demise. Brussels Airlines resumed flights to Burundi seven years later. The passengers heading to Nairobi flew to their destination the next day on a Kenya Airways flight.

After temporary repairs, the aircraft was flown without passengers to Nairobi, carrying technicians from Sabena. The aircraft then flew to Bordeaux for permanent repairs. On 13 January 2001, the aircraft was flown to Brussels. The aircraft finally resumed commercial service on 16 January on a flight to Boston in the United States. The aircraft continued to operate with Sabena until it ceased operations in November 2001. In April 2002, the aircraft was transferred to VG Airlines (later was rebranded as Delsey Airlines) under the same registration, operating for them until October the same year. In April 2003, the aircraft was later transferred to Malaysia Airlines registered as 9M-MKV until July 2013. On the same month, the aircraft was later transferred to Windrose Airlines registered as UR-WRQ until August 2017 when it was returned to the lessor and ferried to MOD St Athan in Wales for scrapping. In January 2018, the aircraft was re-registered as LZ-AWP by DAE Capital and ultimately broken up in August 2018.

References 

2000 in Burundi
2000 crimes in Africa
Aviation accidents and incidents in 2000
Aviation in Belgium
Accidents and incidents involving the Airbus A330
December 2000 events in Africa